Lincoln Plaza at SunTrust Center  is a 16-story office building in downtown Orlando, Florida. The building was completed in 2000 at a cost of $43 million.

Construction on the building began in April 1999. A construction worker was killed in accident during construction of the building when a large piece of lumber fell from the eighth floor and struck him in the face.

The building attained a 45% occupancy rate shortly after completion, with lease rates of $26.50 per square foot.

In 2010, the building received LEED certification, the first for an existing building in Orlando.

See also
Dynetech Centre
List of tallest buildings in Orlando
Premiere Trade Plaza Office Tower II
Premiere Trade Plaza Office Tower III
Solaire at the Plaza

References

External links
3D rendering of Lincoln Plaza

Skyscraper office buildings in Orlando, Florida
Office buildings completed in 2000
2000 establishments in Florida